Emerald is a rural town and locality in the Central Highlands Region, Queensland, Australia.

The town is the headquarters for the Central Highlands Regional Council.

Geography 
Emerald lies on the Nogoa River, a tributary of the Fitzroy River. Emerald sits approximately 10 km south of the Tropic of Capricorn.

History 
The traditional owners include the Gayiri people who occupied the area for tens of thousands of years before European colonisation began in the nineteenth century. The Gayiri (Kairi, Khararya) language region takes in the landscape of the Central Highlands Region, including Emerald and the Nogoa River.

The first European to explore the area was Ludwig Leichhardt between 1843 and 1845. The British Colony of Queensland was established in 1859.

The town takes its name from the emerald and other precious stone deposits in the area and from the pastoral run Emerald Downs, a name chosen circa 1860 by pastoralist Peter Fitzallan Macdonald. It is unclear whether emeralds were found in or around Emerald.

Emerald was established in 1879 as a base for the Central line railway from Rockhampton.  Emerald Post Office opened on 5 June 1879.

Emerald State School opened on 3 November 1879. A secondary department was added to the school in 1919 but that department was closed in 1921. The secondary department reopened in 1959 and operated until the separate Emerald State High School opened in 1969.

St Patrick's Catholic School was established on 31 January 1902 by the Presentation Sisters. They provided a boarding facility for girls and boys from 1906 to 1961. The last of the Presentation Sisters left the school in 1992 after which it was operated by the Rockhampton Catholic Education Office.

Emerald North State School opened on 29 January 1980. A preschool was added on 20 February 1980. A special education unit opened on 23 January 1984. The preschool and special education units closed in 1999.

The Emerald campus of the Capricornia School of Distance Education opened on 1 February 1993.

The new Emerald Library building opened in 1994.

Marist College was established in 1996 by the Marist Brothers.

Denison State School opened on 28 January 1997.

Emerald Christian College (also known as Emerald Educational College) opened in 2001.

In 2007, the Emerald Uniting Church was enlarged by the Uniting congregation at Fernlees when that church was closed.

St Brigid's Catholic Primary School was established in 2014 by the Rockhampton Catholic Education Office.

Ontrack School opened in February 2018.

On 17 April 2020, the Queensland Government re-drew the boundaries of localities within the Central Highlands Region by replacing the locality of The Gemfields with three new localities of Rubyvale, Sapphire Central and Anakie Siding (around the towns of Rubyvale, Sapphire, and Anakie respectively).

In , the population of the locality of Emerald was 14,906 people.

Flooding
Some of the recorded floods to have occurred in the region include 1863, 1864, 1868, 1870, 1871, 1872, 1875, 1876, 1878, 1882, 1887, 1890, 1894, 1896, 1898, 1906, 1912, 1918, 1920s, 1950 (where 1103.77 mm rain was recorded in Queensland), 1956 was the wettest year on record with 1032.29 mm rainfall. The 1970s also had similar rainfall to the 1860s and 1870s.

Prior to the 1990s, flood damage to residential properties was almost non-existent.  The biggest impact of flooding of the Nogoa River in Emerald itself was that one side of Emerald was cut off from the other and caravans at the Carinya Caravan Park would be towed to higher ground each time the Nogoa River rose, to prevent the caravans from being completely submerged. This caravan park is now the site of the Centro Property where Coles Supermarket and other businesses operate. A former swamp area is now part of Kidd Street (a housing development) which was an old river course. The watercourse that extended along the back of the hospital, past the rear of Woolworths and past the Information Centre has been converted into a channel with a concrete section on one side near the information centre, reducing the channel in size by approximately two-thirds. This area has been allowed to be developed in the vicinity of Creek Street.

Fairbairn Dam overflowed for the first time in 17 years on 19 January 2008. Major flooding in Emerald occurred a few days later as the Nogoa River broke its banks. The floods resulted in 1,000 houses being affected and more than 2,500 people being evacuated. The 2008 floods did not reach the heights of flooding in previous years.

Demographics 

As at June 2018, Emerald had an estimated urban population of 14,119.  

In , the population of the locality of Emerald was 14,906 people.
 Aboriginal and Torres Strait Islander people made up 5% of the population. 
 77% of people were born in Australia. The next most common countries of birth were New Zealand (4%), Philippines (1.7%), South Africa (1.4%) and England (1.1%).   
 83% of people spoke only English at home. Other languages spoken at home included Afrikaans at 0.9%, and Tongan at 0.8%.
 36.9% of people identified as non-religious, followed by 21.8% Catholic, and 10.6% Anglican.

Heritage listings 
Emerald has a number of heritage-listed sites, including:
 Clermont Street (Capricorn Highway): Emerald railway station

Economy
Emerald is a service town for a large number of industries in the area. Extensive coal mining operations are carried out in the district. Cotton is grown in the area, and is processed at the Yamala Cotton Gin, while other agricultural activities include grape, citrus and grain growing.

The citrus industry was severely affected by a citrus canker outbreak that started in 2004 and was declared over in early 2009. More than half a million citrus trees located around Emerald had to be destroyed.

Emerald Solar Park is immediately west of the town and generates up to 74MW of electricity.

Education 
Emerald State School is a government primary (Prep-6) school for boys and girls at Anakie Street. In 2017, the school had an enrolment of 316 students with 25 teachers (21 full-time equivalent) and 14 non-teaching staff (8 full-time equivalent).

Emerald North State School is a government primary (Early Childhood-6) school for boys and girls at Campbell Street. In 2017, the school had an enrolment of 249 students with 25 teachers (23 full-time equivalent) and 29 non-teaching staff (18 full-time equivalent). It includes a special education program.

Denison State School is a government primary (Prep-6) school for boys and girls at 16 Gray Street. In 2017, the school had an enrolment of 497 students with 36 teachers (33 full-time equivalent) and 20 non-teaching staff (14 full-time equivalent). It includes a special education program.

Capricornia School of Distance Education is a government primary and secondary (Early Childhood-12) school for boys and girls at the corner Gray and Gladstone Streets. In 2017, the school had an enrolment of 775 students with 72 teachers (64 full-time equivalent) and 21 non-teaching staff (15 full-time equivalent). It includes a special education program. The school operates from the Denison State School campus.

Emerald State High School is a government secondary (7-12) school for boys and girls at Old Airport Drive. In 2017, the school had an enrolment of 780 students with 62 teachers (59 full-time equivalent) and 33 non-teaching staff (22 full-time equivalent). It includes a special education program.

St Patrick's Catholic Primary School is a Catholic primary (Prep-6) school for boys and girls at 41 Yamala Street. In 2017, the school had an enrolment of 491 students with 31 teachers (29 full-time equivalent) and 16 non-teaching staff (9 full-time equivalent).

St Brigid's Catholic Primary School is a Catholic primary (Prep-6) school for boys and girls at Gregory Highway. In 2017, the school had an enrolment of 202 students with 16 teachers (15 full-time equivalent) and 8 non-teaching staff (5 full-time equivalent).

Marist College Emerald is a Catholic secondary (7-12) school for boys and girls at Jeppesen Drive. In 2017, the school had an enrolment of 569 students with 50 teachers (47 full-time equivalent) and 25 non-teaching staff (19 full-time equivalent).

Emerald Christian College is a private primary and secondary (Prep-12) school for boys and girls at Lot 2 Gregory Highway. In 2017, the school had an enrolment of 196 students with 22 teachers (20 full-time equivalent) and 18 non-teaching staff (10 full-time equivalent).

Ontrack  is a private primary and secondary (5-10) school at 114 Borilla Street. It seeks to provide for students from Years 6 to 10 who have disengaged from mainstream schools.

The school closed in 1949 and subsequently reopened.

Central Queensland University has a campus in Emerald.

Amenities 
Central Highlands Regional Council operates Emerald Library at 44 Borilla Street, Emerald.

The Emerald branch of the Queensland Country Women's Association meets at the QCWA Rooms at 45 Borilla Street.

Emerald Uniting Church is at 49 Yamala Streets (corner of Borilla Street).

Calvary Christian Church is at 11 Gladstone Street.

Attractions
To the west of the town is an area known as The Gemfields, with small towns such as Sapphire and Rubyvale indicating the type of gems found there. The sapphire fields located here are the largest in the southern hemisphere.

The Fairbairn Dam, a short drive to the south of the town, was opened in 1972, and holds back the waters of Lake Maraboon. When full, it holds three times more water than Sydney Harbour. This extensive water supply has allowed the cotton industry to flourish in the area, and the lake is a boon for local water sports.

Erected in 1999, the world's largest Vincent van Gogh sunflower painting is situated in Moreton Park. The structure is 25 metres high and celebrates the town's history of sunflower agriculture. Created by Cameron Cross for the 'Van Gogh Project', the canvas art represents localities over seven countries.

Media

Newspapers

Emerald Today, published each Friday, is the local Emerald newspaper. The newspaper focuses on local news and sport.

Radio

Emerald is served by two local commercial stations, one local ABC station and one local community station.

4HI is the oldest local radio station in Emerald, beginning transmissions from their local studio in November 1981.  The station offers local breakfast and drive programming from their Emerald studio and carries nationally syndicated programming from 2GB Sydney.

In the late 1990s, youth-orientated commercial station Hot FM was launched in Emerald.  Even though the station plays local commercials and imaging on a local frequency, no programming on the station originates from Emerald.  Until 2013, the breakfast program which aired on Hot FM in Emerald was a regionally networked program from Townsville.  It was subsequently replaced with the Hot FM CQ breakfast program that originates from Gladstone.

Emerald is served by ABC Capricornia, the region's ABC Local Radio station.  ABC Capricornia is broadcast on a local frequency, but no programming originates from Emerald as the station's local breakfast and morning programs are relayed to the Emerald transmitter from Rockhampton.

Emerald is also served by local community radio station, 4EEE.

Television

Emerald receives all available ABC and commercial television stations from Rockhampton, and therefore local news bulletins Seven Local News and WIN News are broadcast to Emerald, with the bulletins occasionally featuring local news from the Central Highlands region.

Climate 
Emerald has a hot semi-arid climate (Koppen: BSh) with very hot summers with moderate precipitation and mild, dry winters. Average maximum temperatures range from 34.7 °C in January to 23.4 °C in June, while average minimums range from 22.3 °C to 9.1 °C. The average annual rainfall is 543.2 mm. The wettest year on record was 1099.2 mm in 2010. Extremes of temperature have ranged from 45.6 °C to 0.6 °C, while the wettest 24 hours on record was 140.0 mm on 2 March 1994.

Notable residents 
 Ethan Bullemor, Australian Rugby League player
 Mitchell Langerak, Australian footballer
 Alan McIndoe, Australian Rugby League player

See also

 Emerald Airport

References

External links 

 
 Town map of Emerald, 1985
 Emerald State High School Homepage

 
Mining towns in Queensland
Towns in Queensland
Central Highlands Region
1879 establishments in Australia
Populated places established in 1879
Localities in Queensland